Barracuda MVC was an open-source web application framework for developing Java EE web applications that was an alternative to struts.  The project is no longer active.

See also
 Model-view-controller
 Apache Struts
 Java EE
 Google Web Toolkit

External links
Barracuda MVC Home page

Java enterprise platform
Web frameworks